Vologodsky (masculine), Vologodskaya (feminine), or Vologodskoye (neuter) may refer to:
Vologodsky District, a district of Vologda Oblast, Russia
Vologda Oblast (Vologodskaya oblast), a federal subject of Russia